Fritillaria tubiformis is a bulbous perennial plant in the lily family Liliaceae, native to Alpine regions of southwestern France and northern Italy.

Subspecies
 Fritillaria tubiformis var. burnatii (Planch.) Rouy
 Fritillaria tubiformis subsp. moggridgei (Boiss. & Reut. ex Planch.) Rix
 Fritillaria tubiformis subsp. tubiformis

References

External links
Alpine Garden Society Plant Encyclopedia, Fritillaria tubiformis
Botany Czech, Fritillaria tubiformis subsp. moggridgei  in Czech with color photos
Acta Plantarum Galleria della Flora italiana, Fritillaria tubiformis 
Flore Alpes

tubiformis
Plants described in 1854
Flora of France
Flora of Italy